This is a listing of the horses that finished in either first, second, or third place and the number of starters in the William Donald Schaefer Handicap, a grade 3 American thoroughbred horse race run on dirt at 1-1/8 miles for three-year-olds and up at Pimlico Race Course  in Baltimore, Maryland.

A † designates an American Champion or Eclipse Award winner.

References

External links
Pimlico racetrack

Pimlico Race Course
Lists of horse racing results